George Parkinson may refer to:

 George Parkinson (footballer, born 1892) (1892–1959), Australian rules footballer with Richmond
 George Parkinson (footballer, born 1893) (1893–1960), Australian rules footballer with Essendon
 Fred Parkinson (George Joshua Francis Parkinson, 1884–1913), Australian rules footballer with Essendon and Collingwood